Alessandre Blandino (born November 6, 1992) is a Nicaraguan American professional baseball infielder who is currently a free agent. He has played in Major League Baseball (MLB) for the Cincinnati Reds. He played college baseball at Stanford and was drafted by the Reds in the first round of the 2014 Major League Baseball draft.

Amateur career
Blandino was drafted by the Oakland Athletics in the 38th round of the 2011 Major League Baseball draft out of St. Francis High School in Mountain View, California. He did not sign and attended Stanford University. He played college baseball for the Stanford Cardinal from 2012 to 2014, hitting .292/.372/.504 with 27 home runs in 157 games. After his freshman and sophomore seasons, he played collegiate summer baseball for the Yarmouth–Dennis Red Sox of the Cape Cod Baseball League, batting .323 in 2012 and .319 in 2013, and in both seasons was named the starting third baseman for the East Division All-Star team.

Professional career

Cincinnati Reds
The Cincinnati Reds selected Blandino in the first round of the 2014 Major League Baseball draft. He signed and was assigned to the Billings Mustangs, and after batting .309 with four home runs, 16 RBIs, and a .939 OPS in 29 games, was promoted to the Dayton Dragons, where he finished the season, batting .261 with four home runs and 16 RBIs in 34 games. In 2015, he played for both the Daytona Tortugas and the Pensacola Blue Wahoos, posting a combined .278 batting average with ten home runs and 53 RBIs, and 2016 with Pensacola, batting .232 with eight home runs and 37 RBIs. Blandino spent 2017 with Pensacola and the Louisville Bats, slashing a combined .265/.382/.453 with 12 home runs and 51 RBIs in 125 total games between both teams. Blandino played for the Nicaraguan national baseball team in the 2017 World Baseball Classic Qualifier. The Reds added him to their 40-man roster after the 2017 season.

Blandino made his major league debut with the Reds on April 10, 2018, and hit his first major league home run on May 1, 2018 off Milwaukee Brewers pitcher Jacob Barnes. Perhaps his most noteworthy accomplishment with the Reds came July 11, 2018 when he appeared in the 8th inning of a blowout loss against the Cleveland Indians. He struck out two of the four batters he faced, including one with knuckle ball that drew high praise on the broadcast and social media. Blandino eventually tore his ACL on July 20, 2018, and as a result would miss the rest of the season.

In 2019 for Cincinnati, Blandino appeared in 23 contests, slashing .250/.420/.361 with 1 home run and 3 RBI, and did not appear in a major league game in the 2020 season, spending the season at the alternate training site.

He pitched again for Cincinnati on April 28, 2021 in the bottom of the 8th inning against the Los Angeles Dodgers, retiring the one batter he faced on a flyout. The Reds had previously given up 6 runs in the inning, putting them behind 8-0 when Blandino appeared to close out the inning. On July 17, Blandino was placed on the 60-day injured list with a fractured right hand. He was activated off of the injured list in mid-August and optioned to Triple-A Louisville. Blandino was outrighted off of the 40-man roster on November 4. He elected free agency on November 8.

San Francisco Giants
On December 10, 2021, Blandino signed a minor league contract with the San Francisco Giants.

Seattle Mariners
On May 14, 2022, Blandino was traded by the Giants to the Seattle Mariners in exchange for Stuart Fairchild. He was released on August 1, 2022. On January 31, 2023, he announced that he would be representing Nicaragua in the 2023 World Baseball Classic.

References

External links

Stanford Cardinal bio

1992 births
Living people
Sportspeople from Palo Alto, California
Baseball players from California
Major League Baseball infielders
Cincinnati Reds players
Stanford Cardinal baseball players
Yarmouth–Dennis Red Sox players
Billings Mustangs players
Dayton Dragons players
Daytona Tortugas players
Pensacola Blue Wahoos players
Peoria Javelinas players
Louisville Bats players
Sacramento River Cats players
Tacoma Rainiers players
American people of Nicaraguan descent
2023 World Baseball Classic players